Yingli, formally Yingli Green Energy Holding Company Limited - . Yingli Green Energy Holding Company Limited, known as "Yingli Solar," is a solar panel manufacturer.  Yingli Green Energy's manufacturing covers the photovoltaic value chain from ingot casting and wafering through solar cell production and solar panel assembly. Yingli's photovoltaic module capacity is 30 GWs.

Yingli is headquartered in Baoding, China and has more than 100 regional subsidiaries and branch offices and has distributed more than 30 GW solar panels to customers worldwide. Yingli Solar was established in 1997 and was the world's largest PV module manufacturers in the world in 2012 and 2013. Yingli was founded by Liansheng Miao who was a pioneer in Chinese solar manufacturing. Miao worked to persuade other people to encourage the growth of Chinese solar industry as Miao saw that solar manufacturing is an industry in which China can be competitive.

Yingli expanded production capacity at a time module prices slumped. Yingli recovered slowly and since early 2015 has faced financial difficulties and has been going through a debt restructuring out of court. In 2015 signed a contract with LONGi to cooperate on monocrystalline products. In the first quarter of 2016 Yingli posted a profit first time since 2011. Yingli has cut workforce and decreased R&D spending. Yingli's cost per watt is 41 cents. The company was a sponsor of the 2014 FIFA World Cup, U.S. men's and women's national soccer teams, and FC Bayern Munich.

Yingli is a member of the ‘Silicon Module Super League’ (SMSL), a group of big-six c-Si module suppliers in the solar PV industry today. The other five members of the group are Canadian Solar, Hanwha Q CELLS, JA Solar, Trina Solar and Jinko Solar.

History

Yingli Green Energy was established in 1998 by Liansheng Miao, who remains the company's chairman and CEO. Yingli Green Energy began module production in 2003, with a capacity of 3 MW. By 2004, Yingli reached 6 MW in ingot/wafer/cell production, and 50 MW in module production. The company also expanded into Germany and achieved certifications from UL, the IEC and TÜV Rheinland. After continued expansion and fundraising efforts, Yingli Green Energy completed its IPO on the New York Stock Exchange in June 2007.   In 2009, Yingli achieved 1 GW of cumulative output of solar modules since commercial production began in 2003.  Today, Yingli Green Energy has a balanced vertically integrated production capacity of 2,450 MW per year.

In 2009, the company acquired Cyber Power, a development stage enterprise with plans to begin production of solar-grade polysilicon. Yingli Solar is expected to start trial polysilicon by the end of 2010. Growing at a fast rate, 2010 first quarter reports indicated that it was Yingli Solar's most profitable quarter to date.

In 2010, Yingli Green Energy became the first Chinese company and the first renewable energy company to sponsor the FIFA World Cup. Yingli was also a sponsor of the 2014 FIFA World Cup in Brazil.  It supplied modules to 2014 FIFA World Cup stadiums, including the Maracana Stadium in Rio de Janeiro.

Building on its partnership with FIFA, Yingli is also a sponsor of FC Bayern München and the U.S. Soccer Women's and Men's National Teams.

Products
Over 15 GW of  Yingli solar modules are deployed worldwide. In 2012, Yingli Green Energy reached a production capacity of 2,450 MW per year, making it the largest solar module manufacturer in the world in terms of module production capacity. It also became the world's leading solar module supplier by sales revenue and shipments in Q1 2012.   Also in 2012, Ray Lian predicted that Yingli Green Energy was likely to become the world's largest supplier in terms of full-year module shipments in 2012.

Yingli manufactures crystalline silicon solar PV modules, including both, monocrystalline and multicrystalline. Its two primary solar module product lines are the monocrystalline PANDA Series and the multicrystalline YGE Series.

Yingli Solar's PANDA product line was developed through an in-house collaboration between the Energy Research Centre of the Netherlands (ECN) and Amtech Systems, Inc. that aimed to create a new, more efficient solar cell.  PANDA modules use n-doped silicon instead of the industry's standard p-type silicon, allowing a more efficient conversion of infrared light into electricity, and lower initial degradation rate. As the PANDA product line is claimed by the company to achieve performance ratings of up to 16.5%, it is best suited to commercial or residential applications where maximum energy output is essential due to space constraints.
 
Yingli Solar's YGE Series is its primary product line. The company claims that these multicrystalline modules have efficiencies of up to 15.4%, for use in commercial, residential, and utility-scale projects.

Yingli Solar's manufacturing facilities are located in Baoding, Haikou, Tianjin, and Hengshui. Yingli Americas, a regional subsidiary of Yingli Green Energy, operates a regional research and development lab, the PV Testing Lab (PVTL), in South San Francisco, California. The PVTL conducts product characterization and quality control testing, and provides customers with system modeling support.

Social responsibility

Yingli is the largest and first official module supplier to GRID Alternatives, an Oakland, California-based non-profit solar installer that provides low-income families with solar energy systems free of charge. By the end of 2012, Yingli will have helped over 800 families save substantially on their electricity bills through its support of GRID Alternatives. Thousands of job seekers will also receive professional training through this partnership.

Yingli has also sponsored the United States Soccer Federation to launch the Powering Advancement with Solar and Soccer (PASS) program. The PASS program provides schools in disadvantaged communities with solar energy systems and support for their healthy lifestyle programs. The program was launched at the KIPP DC: Will Academy charter school in Washington, DC on June 1, 2012.

As part of its sponsorship of the 2010 FIFA World Cup in South Africa, Yingli participates in the “Football for Hope. Energy for Hope.” initiative that aims to bring football training and community centers to communities in Africa. Yingli is working with FIFA to provide these twenty football training and community centers with clean solar energy.

See also
Solar power in China

References

External links
Company website
Reuters

Companies formerly listed on the New York Stock Exchange
Engineering companies of China
Solar energy companies of China
Photovoltaics manufacturers
Renewable resource companies established in 1998
Chinese companies established in 1998
Energy companies established in 1998
Companies based in Baoding
Chinese brands